Devosia subaequoris is a Gram-negative, oxidase- and catalase-positive, non-spore-forming, motile bacteria from the genus of Devosia which was isolated from a sediment sample from the Hwasun Beach in Jeju in the Republic of Korea.

References

External links
Type strain of Devosia subaequoris at BacDive -  the Bacterial Diversity Metadatabase

Gram-negative bacteria
Hyphomicrobiales
Bacteria described in 2007